Ursine is an unincorporated community and census-designated place in Lincoln County, Nevada, United States. It is located in the foothills of the White Rock Mountains on Eagle Valley about two miles downstream from the Eagle Valley Reservoir and Spring Valley State Park. The population was 91 at the 2010 census.

A post office was established at Ursine in 1895, and remained in operation until 1959. The community was named after the valley in which it is located.

Demographics

References

Census-designated places in Nevada
Census-designated places in Lincoln County, Nevada